Katarzyna Mroczkowska  (born ) is a retired Polish volleyball player, who played as a middle blocker.

She was part of the Poland women's national volleyball team at the 2001 Women's European Volleyball Championship, and 2002 FIVB Volleyball Women's World Championship in Germany. On club level she played with Palac Bydgoszcz.

Clubs
 Palac Bydgoszcz (2002)

References

External links
cev.lu

1980 births
Living people
Polish women's volleyball players
Place of birth missing (living people)